Museum Park or Park Museum may refer to:
Skyscrapers
 One Museum Park in Chicago, Illinois, U.S.
 One Museum Park West in Chicago
 Ten Museum Park in Miami, Florida, U.S.
Museums
 Clifton Park Museum in Rotherham, South Yorkshire, England
 Weston Park Museum in Sheffield, England
Parks
 Museum Park (Miami), a park in Miami
 Forest Park Museum and Arboretum in Perry, Iowa, U.S.
Other
Museum Park station, a Metromover station in Miami